Love's Confusion is an East German romantic comedy film directed by Slátan Dudow. It was released in 1959.

Plot
Students Dieter and Sonja, who are a couple for several years, attend a masquerade. Dieter confuses young Siegi with his friend and dances with her. He cannot forget her even after realizing she is not Sonja, and falls in love with her. Sonja, bitter and jealous, starts an affair with Siegi's boyfriend, Edy. The two new couples go on vacation in the Baltic Sea, where they encounter each other several times while enjoying the local attractions. They all resolve to marry their new partners. Only when they are headed toward the same registration office, do they realize their behavior was motivated by spite and anger. They again switch partners: Sonja marries Dieter and Siegi marries Edy.

Cast
 Angelica Domröse: Siegi
 Annekathrin Bürger: Sonja
 Willi Schrade: Dieter
 Stefan Lisewski: Edy
 Martin Flörchinger: Professor Boerwald
 Erik S. Klein: Professor for social sciences
 Friedrich Richter (actor)|Friedrich Richter: Professor Böck
 Werner Dissel: taxi driver
 Ursula Fröhlich: Sonja's mother

Production
Love's Confusion was Dudow's last film. Influenced by the relaxed political climate ushered with the Khrushchev Thaw, the picture was unprecedentedly libertine in regards to sexuality .

The film was the screen debut of actress Angelica Domröse, who has been selected from among 800 contestants who applied for auditions. Principal photography lasted eleven months.

Dudow's work greatly exceeded its approved budget, which was originally set on 2,309,500 East German Mark; additional costs reached some 925,000 DDM. Karl-Eduard von Schnitzler published an article in Neues Deutschland critical of the delays and expenditures.

In addition, the director faced difficulties in including a scene featuring nude bathing. While the DEFA studio insisted on its removal, Dudow attempted to preserve it by turning it into a dream sequence; he appealed to Minister of Culture Alexander Abusch, a former naturist who appeared in Dudow's 1932 Kuhle Wampe as a nude extra. Abusch forwarded the decision directly to Walter Ulbricht, who denied the request.

Reception
Love's Confusion sold 1,900,000 tickets in East Germany. While it was not met with approval by government officials and the cultural establishment, it enjoyed great popularity with audiences, becoming "a huge hit."

Neues Deutschland critic Horst Knietzsch wrote that the film was "an attempt to demonstrate in an amusing fashion the victorious strength of socialist life." Der Morgen reviewer Christoph Funke commented that "the love of young people today... Knows no tragic consequences, since it is rooted in socialist order." West German Heinz Kersten noted that Love's Confusion was "refreshing" as it virtually lacked a political message, a rare feature in East German cinema.

Antonin and Miera Liehm defined the film as an "exception among DEFA's productions and an honorable conclusion of Dudow's career."

References

Bibliography
 Joshua Feinstein. The Triumph of the Ordinary: Depictions of Daily Life in the East German Cinema, 1949–1989. University of North Carolina Press (2002). .
 Miera Liehm, Antonin J. Liehm. The Most Important Art: Soviet and Eastern European Film After 1945. University of California Press (1977). 
 Hans-Michael Bock, Tim Bergfelder. The Concise Cinegraph: Encyclopaedia of German Cinema. Berghahn Books (2009). .
 Dagmar Schittly. Zwischen Regie und Regime. Die Filmpolitik der SED im Spiegel der DEFA-Produktionen. Links (2002). .
 Ingrid Poss. Spur der Filme: Zeitzeugen über die DEFA. Links (2006). .
 Heinz Kersten. Das Filmwesen in der Sowjetischen Besatzungszone Deutschlands. Bundesministerium für Gesamtdeutsche Fragen (1963). ASIN B0000BK48Q.

External links
 
 Verwirrung der Liebe. cinema.de.
 Verwirrung der Liebe. progress-film.de.
 Verwirrung der Liebe. filmportal.de.

1959 films
East German films
1950s German-language films
Films set in Berlin
German romantic comedy films
1959 romantic comedy films
Films set in the Baltic Sea
Films directed by Slatan Dudow
1950s German films